The Penal Colony may refer to:

 The Penal Colony: Stories and Short Pieces, a collection of short stories and recollections by Franz Kafka
 The Penal Colony (film), a 1970 Chilean drama film

See also
 "In the Penal Colony", a short story by Franz Kafka
 Penal colony, a settlement used to exile prisoners
 Penal Colony (band), an American electro-industrial group